The American Cornhole League (ACL) is the sanctioning body for the sport of professional cornhole in the United States and is the originator of competitive cornhole. Headquartered in Rock Hill, SC, the ACL hosts over 25,000 tournaments per year and has an active player base of over 100,000 players.

The ACL features a group of professional cornhole players each season that compete on television broadcasts (network partners include ESPN and CBS). These players are referred to as ACL Pros.

The ACL is majority owned by ACL Commissioner Stacey Moore. In 2021, the ACL introduced its first outside investors of Asland Capital Partners and John Thompson III.

History 
The ACL was founded in 2015 by ACL Commissioner Stacey Moore. Part of the standardization of equipment for the league was rooted in its proprietary ACL Bag Policy which standardized the cornhole bag for competitive play and the league's partnership with AllCornhole for officially licensed ACL Pro cornhole boards. The league debuted its first championship event in 2016, named the Championship of Bags, which aired on ESPN3. One year later, the ACL appeared on television for the first time, airing its 2017 Championships of Bags on ESPN2 on the back of its first ESPN deal. At the conclusion of the 2019 season, the ACL created a non-profit governing body for the sport in the United States called USA Cornhole, with the idea of making cornhole an Olympic Sport.

In 2020 amid the COVID-19 pandemic, the ACL aired on ESPN networks for six straight weeks, propelling exponential growth for the league and sport. In 2021, the ACL signed a network contract with CBS Sports and introduced a new ACL Pro Shootout Series.

Divisions 
The two main divisions of the American Cornhole League are the Pro Division and Open Division. Pro Division tournaments are specifically reserved for ACL Pros. Open Division tournaments are open to all ACL members and to the general public. Both divisions span the length of the ACL season which runs October through August each year.

References 

Sports leagues in the United States
Lawn games